The Royal Medal, also known as The Queen's Medal and The King's Medal (depending on the gender of the monarch at the time of the award), is a silver-gilt medal, of which three are awarded each year by the Royal Society, two for "the most important contributions to the advancement of natural knowledge" and one for "distinguished contributions in the applied sciences", done within the Commonwealth of Nations.

Background
The award was created by George IV and awarded first during 1826. Initially there were two medals awarded, both for the most important discovery within the year previous, a time period which was lengthened to five years and then shortened to three. The format was endorsed by William IV and Victoria, who had the conditions changed during 1837 so that mathematics was a subject for which a Royal Medal could be awarded, albeit only every third year. The conditions were changed again during 1850 so that:
... the Royal Medals in each year should be awarded for the two most important contributions to the advancement of Natural Knowledge, published originally in Her Majesty's dominions within a period of not more than ten years and not less than one year of the date of the award, subject, of course, to Her Majesty's approval. ... in the award of the Royal Medals, one should be given in each of the two great divisions of Natural Knowledge.

During 1965, the system was changed to its current format, in which three Medals are awarded annually by the Monarch on the recommendation of the Royal Society Council. Because of its dual nature (for both physical and biological science) the award winners are chosen by both the A- and B-side Award Committees. Since its establishment during 1826 the medal has been awarded 405 times.

The award is only given to eminent scientists who are British citizens and residents only.

Recent Winners

Full list of recipients

References

Awards of the Royal Society
Silver-gilt objects
1826 establishments in the United Kingdom
1826 in science
Awards established in 1826